Ray Lorenzo Heffner (March 7, 1925 – November 28, 2012) was an American educator and president of Brown University. He served in the United States Navy during World War II and graduated from Yale College in 1948, where he was elected to Phi Beta Kappa, the Elizabethan Club, and Scroll and Key. He earned his master's degree at Yale in 1950 and his Ph.D., also from Yale, in 1953 following the completion of a dissertation on the Elizabethan poet Michael Drayton.

Heffner was a Guggenheim Fellow for the academic year 1959–1960. In 1966, he accepted the presidency of Brown University. He resigned the presidency of Brown in 1969 stating, “I have simply reached the conclusion that I do not enjoy being a university president.”

Heffner died November 28, 2012 at Lantern Park Nursing & Rehabilitation Center in Coralville, Iowa.

A more detailed biography of President Heffner is available through Brown University's Encyclopedia Brunoniana.

References

1925 births
American educational theorists
Literature educators
People from Durham, North Carolina
Presidents of Brown University
United States Navy officers
Yale College alumni
2012 deaths
United States Navy personnel of World War II